Kristin may refer to:  

 Kristin (name), a Scandinavian form of Christine
 Kristin (TV series), a 2001 American sitcom
 Kristin Peak, Antarctica
 Kristin School, a school in New Zealand

See also 
 Kristen (disambiguation)